is a Japanese light novel series written by Sennendou Taguchi, following Kazumi Yoshinaga and his normal junior high school life with younger sister Futaba Yoshinaga who won a prize from a lottery of a wolf-like gargoyle nicknamed "Gar-kun".

The series was first published in 2004 by Famitsu Bunko (Enterbrain) in Japan. the series was adapted into an anime, which was broadcast on Chiba TV from April 4, 2006. It contained 13 episodes, with the last airing on June 27, 2006.

Characters

Main characters

 Gargoyle (voice: Norio Wakamoto) - A masterpiece gargoyle sculpture built by highly skilled alchemists, it protects the entrance to the Yoshinaga household. Named by the Yoshinagas.
 Futaba Yoshinaga (voice: Chiwa Saito) - The only daughter and youngest member of the household. She is a boyish troublemaker who loves wrestling. In the beginning, she dislikes the Gargoyle.
 Kazumi Yoshinaga (voice: Kouki Miyata) - The older brother of Futaba. Due to his lack of masculinity, he is very often mistaken as a girl by strangers. He often steps in to prevent Futaba from causing more trouble.
 Mimori Onodera (voice: Yūna Inamura) - She is Futaba's friend. Her father is blind and led by a guide dog named Lieutenant Avery.
 Lili Hamilton (voice: Nana Mizuki) - She is Futaba's friend. Her father had been performing alchemy on her, which gave her psychic powers, which allow her to read people's minds and understand their feelings. She now lives with Kaitou Hyakushiki, who she calls Uncle.
 Kaitou Hyakushiki (voice: Susumu Chiba) - He is an extremely clever thief who can also pull off several tricks and escape from tight situations. He is Lili's new guardian.

Secondary characters
 Amane Higashimiya
 Iyo Takahara
 Hisham
 Osiris
 Hamilton

Light novel
Yoshinaga-san Chi no Gargoyle is a Japanese light novel series written by Sennendou Taguchi with accompanying illustrations drawn by Yuji Himukai.

Enterbrain published Fourteen volumes have been serialized in Famitsu Bunko imprint between February 4, 2004 (volume 1) and July 15, 2008 (volume 15). 15 novels are long story compilations released in 2005 and 2008. The first volume of a spin-off series titled Gargoyle Alternative was Published on August 10, 2006 (volume 1) On January 30, 2008 (volume 4), In 2006, it was reported that Yoshinaga-san Chi no Gargoyle had become Famitsu Bunko's No. 1 bestseller.

Yoshinaga-san Chi no Gargoyle was adapted as a 13-episode anime television series by Studio Hibari, which aired in Japan between April 4, 2006, and June 27, 2006, covering the events of the first twelve novels.

Books

 1. Yoshinaga-san Chi no Gargoyle 1 (吉永さん家のガーゴイル 1) Published in February 2004
 2. Yoshinaga-san Chi no Gargoyle 2 (吉永さん家のガーゴイル 2) Published in March 2004
 3. Yoshinaga-san Chi no Gargoyle 3 (吉永さん家のガーゴイル 3) Published in June 2004
 4. Yoshinaga-san Chi no Gargoyle 4 (吉永さん家のガーゴイル 4) Published in September 2004
 5. Yoshinaga-san Chi no Gargoyle 5 (吉永さん家のガーゴイル 5) Published in November 2004
 6. Yoshinaga-san Chi no Gargoyle 6 (吉永さん家のガーゴイル 6) Published in February 2005
 7. Yoshinaga-san Chi no Gargoyle 7 (吉永さん家のガーゴイル 7) Published in May 2005
 8. Yoshinaga-san Chi no Gargoyle 8 (吉永さん家のガーゴイル 8) Published in November 2005
 9. Yoshinaga-san Chi no Gargoyle 9 (吉永さん家のガーゴイル 9) Published in April 2006
 10. Yoshinaga-san Chi no Gargoyle 10 (吉永さん家のガーゴイル 10) Published in May 2006
 11. Yoshinaga-san Chi no Gargoyle 11 (吉永さん家のガーゴイル 11) Published in November 2006
 12. Yoshinaga-san Chi no Gargoyle 12 (吉永さん家のガーゴイル 12) Published in May 2007
 13. Yoshinaga-san Chi no Gargoyle 13 (吉永さん家のガーゴイル 13) Published in October 2007
 14. Yoshinaga-san Chi no Gargoyle 14 (吉永さん家のガーゴイル 14) Published in May 2008
 15. Yoshinaga-san Chi no Gargoyle 15 (吉永さん家のガーゴイル 15) Published in July 2008

There is also another, related series by the name of Gargoyle Alternative.

Gargoyle Alternative

 1. Gargoyle Alternative (ガーゴイルおるたなてぃぶ) Published on August 10, 2006
 2. Gargoyle Alternative 2 (ガーゴイルおるたなてぃぶ 2) Published on January 29, 2007
 3. Gargoyle Alternative 3 (ガーゴイルおるたなてぃぶ 3) Published on July 30, 2007
 4. Gargoyle Alternative 4 (ガーゴイルおるたなてぃぶ 4) Published on January 30, 2008
 5. Gargoyle Alternative ZERO (ガーゴイルおるたなてぃぶZERO) Published on January 30, 2009

Other
 Release: October 30, "Special Yoshinaga house Gargoyles animated" 2,006 years 
In addition to recording the newly written short scenario of 13 episodes anime
" Collaboration Anthology released on August 30 diary a family frenzy "Year 2 008 
"Confiscation frenzy Iromachi your diary and" (Published in "special family diary frenzy FBSP vol.3" SP Famitsu Bunko) Sun day in the "2054 diary! gargoyle frenzy" night "published site" FB Online "official paperback (usually family recorded)
Bluestocking "collaboration Anthology 2" "is stupid and climb the stairs of the Gargoyle" originally published November 11, 2008 Release: October 30, two thousand and eight 
"Gargoyle chestnut beach heaven" recorded (posted site "FB Online" official Famitsu Bunko)
"Magician's Mii in red-3 collaboration anthology" originally published February 12, 2009 Release: January 31, 2009 
Recorded (written down). "I is not Mii gatekeeper of Yoshinaga house in between or ☆"

Manga
The manga drawn by Kagari Tamaoka is serialized in Magi-Cu ("Magical-Cute") magazine. Volume 1 of the tankōbon was released on March 31, 2006.

Anime
The anime adaptation of the light novel was produced by Studio Hibari began airing in April 2006 for the Spring TV season and ended with a total of 13 episodes. Sentai Filmworks licensed the series in 2021.

Themes music
Opening:  by Chiwa Saito, Nana Mizuki, & Yuuna Inamura

Ending 1:  by Chiwa Saito, Nana Mizuki, & Yuuna Inamura

Ending 2:  by Chiwa Saito

For some episode, character specific versions of "Ai nioide, Ai nioide" sung individually by Chiwa Saito, Nana Mizuki, or Yuuna Inamura were used as the ending theme instead of the trio version. "Kotae wa Sora no Shita" was used as the ending theme for episode 13.

Episode list

References

External links
 

2004 Japanese novels
Anime and manga based on light novels
Comedy anime and manga
Enterbrain manga
Famitsu Bunko
Kadokawa Dwango franchises
Light novels
Sentai Filmworks
Shōnen manga
Studio Hibari